Petrophile brevifolia is a species of flowering plant in the family Proteaceae and is endemic to southwestern Western Australia. It is a shrub with cylindrical, sharply-pointed leaves, and spherical heads of hairy yellow, cream-coloured or white flowers.

Description
The flowers are arranged on the ends of branchlets in sessile, spherical heads  in diameter, with many linear or tapering involucral bracts at the base.

Taxonomy
Petrophile brevifolia was first formally described in 1840 by John Lindley in A Sketch of the Vegetation of the Swan River Colony. The specific epithet (brevifolia) means "short-leaved".

Distribution and habitat
This petrophile grows in shrubland, heath and woodland and is widespread and common from Kalbarri National Park to Ongerup in the southwest of Western Australia.

Conservation status
Petrophile brevifolia is classified as "not threatened" by the Government of Western Australia Department of Parks and Wildlife.

References

brevifolia
Eudicots of Western Australia
Endemic flora of Western Australia
Plants described in 1840
Taxa named by John Lindley